Kaarle Tapani Jorma Johannes Magnus Bertel Nordenstreng (born June 9, 1941) is a Finnish sociologist and media scholar. He is Professor Emeritus of Journalism and Mass Communication at the University of Tampere.

Life
Kaarle Nordenstreng studied psychology at the University of Helsinki, gaining a PhD in 1969. He joined the faculty of the University of Tampere in 1965, and became head of research at the Finnish Broadcasting Company in 1967. In 1971 he was appointed Professor of Journalism and Mass Communication at the University of Tampere. From 1971 to 1976 he was a Member of the UNESCO Panel of Consultants on Communication Research, helping to articulate the rationale for a New International Information Order. From 1972 to 1978 he was Vice-President of the International Association For Media And Communication Research (IAMCR). From 1976 to 1990 he was President of the International Organization of Journalists (IOJ). He was Honorary Professor at Saint Petersburg State University in 2008, and Moscow University in 2009.

Works
 Television Traffic - a One-way Street?: A Survey and Analysis of the International Flow of Television Programme Material. UNESCO, 1974
 (ed. with Herbert Schiller) National sovereignty and international communication, 1979
 The Mass Media Declaration of UNESCO, 1984
 (ed. with George Gerbner and Hamid Mowlana) The Global media debate: its rise, fall, and renewal, 1991
 (ed. with Herbert Schiller) Beyond national sovereignty: international communication in the 1990s, 1992
 (with Clifford G. Christians, Theodore L. Glasser, Denis McQuail and Robert A. White) Normative theories of the media: journalism in democratic societies , 2009
 'How the New World Order and Imperialism Challenge Media Studies', tripleC, Vol. 11, No. 2 (2013)
 (ed. with Clifford G. Christians) Communication theories in a multicultural world, 2014
 (with Ulf Jonas Björk, Frank Beyersdorf, Svennik Høyer and Epp Lauk) A history of the international movement of journalists: professionalism versus politics, 2016

References

1941 births
Living people
Finnish sociologists
Finnish journalists
Mass media scholars